Kevin Eddie Lewis Betsy (born 20 March 1978) is a football coach and former professional footballer.

He started his career with Woking but went on to make a name for himself with Fulham where he became part of the squad that earned promotions in 1999 and 2001 that made the club a Premier League team. He made one appearance in the top tier of English football, becoming the first Seychellois player to play in the Premier League. He then also spent time on loan with AFC Bournemouth, Hull City, and Barnsley before joining the latter on a permanent deal in 2002. Betsy made 94 league appearances, scoring 15 goals in a two-year period with the Tykes before moving to Hartlepool United. His time with Pool was short and he moved on to Oldham Athletic and then Wycombe Wanderers.

In 2007, he signed for Bristol City and whilst there spent loan spells with Yeovil Town and Walsall. A year after signing for City he moved on again to Southend United before returning to Wycombe following a loan spell. In 2012, he re-signed for Woking. Despite being born in England, Betsy qualified to represent the Seychelles through his grandparents and earned his first cap in 2011. Following a move into coaching, Betsy worked as a coach for the England U16 team, later taking up similar roles with the U17 and U18 teams. He later spent a season as U23 coach of Arsenal before managing Crawley Town briefly in 2022.

Playing career

Early career
Betsy started his career at Woking, representing England at semi professional level and being named Conference Player of the Year in 1998. In September 1998, Betsy was signed by Fulham for a fee of £80,000, which would potentially rise to £125,000, with manager Kevin Keegan describing him as one of the best young players he had seen at his age. He made his debut at Anfield against Liverpool in the League Cup and spent three years at Fulham. Betsy's only goal for Fulham came in their victorious 1998–99 Division Two campaign against Millwall. He made five league appearances during Fulham's 2000/01 season after which they were promoted to the Premier League. He made one appearance in the Premiership for Fulham under Jean Tigana in a game against Manchester United at Old Trafford. He had loan spells at AFC Bournemouth and Hull City.

Barnsley and Oldham Athletic
On 1 March 2002, Betsy joined Barnsley on a one-month loan. After five appearances, Betsy was signed by Barnsley for a fee of £200,000 on 28 March 2002. He made over 90 appearances for the club and scored 17 goals and was the club's top goal scorer in 2002–03 season with 11 goals from midfield. Betsy had a short loan spell with Hartlepool United in August 2004, making six appearances and scoring once. On 8 September 2004, he signed for Oldham Athletic on a contract until the end of the season, after his Barnsley contract was terminated by mutual consent. At Oldham, he scored five goals and was a key member of the team which defeated Manchester City in the FA Cup.

Wycombe Wanderers
After turning down Oldham's offer of a new contract, Betsy moved to Wycombe Wanderers in July 2005, signing a two-year contract. Betsy was a regular in the Wycombe team during the 2005–06 season. He was also a regular goalscorer for the club, most notably with a hat-trick against Mansfield Town in September 2005 and in April 2006. Betsy was honoured by his fellow professionals by being named in the Professional Footballers's Association (PFA) "Team Of The Year" for League Two and helped Wycombe reach the play-offs. Betsy's last game for Wycombe was a notable one, the League Cup semi final defeat against the eventual winners Chelsea at Stamford Bridge.

Bristol City
In January 2007, it was announced that Betsy had been signed by League One Bristol City for a fee of £200,000. He was ever present in the city line up helping the Robins gain Promotion to Championship, scoring once in the process against Northampton. Betsy joined Yeovil Town on loan in October 2007. He returned to Bristol City on 7 November as Yeovil could not afford to extend the loan, having scored once for Yeovil against Swansea City. He turned down a loan deal to Cheltenham Town in November 2007. On 31 January 2008, Betsy joined Walsall for the rest of the season on loan.

Southend United and return to Wycombe Wanderers
Betsy signed for Southend United on 7 August 2008, on a two-year contract.

On 1 September 2009, Betsy re-signed for Wycombe Wanderers on a loan until 2 January 2010. On 15 January 2010, after a successful loan, Betsy signed for Wycombe on a permanent basis until the end of the season, having been released from Southend. Betsy also led the team in assists with eight, scoring five goals and being voted (OWWSA) Wycombe Supporters Player of the year. In May 2010, Betsy agreed a new two-year deal with the club. Betsy was a regular in the Wycombe promotion side in 2010–11, but found first team opportunities limited in 2011–12, and left the club by mutual consent on 20 December 2011.

Return to Woking
On 17 February 2012, Betsy re-joined Woking as a free agent until the end of the 2011–12 season. After re-joining he has made a big impact in the team and in his fourth game back, he won two penalties in the space of five minutes. He went on to win the Conference South title with Woking having beaten Maidenhead United 1–0 away. After the success at the end of the 2011–12 season, Betsy signed on for another season at Woking. In June 2014, Betsy signed a new one-year contract. He remained at Woking until the end of the 2014–15 season before deciding to stop playing football so he could focus on his coaching career.

International career
Betsy is of Seychellois descent and, after having rejected the chance to play for the Seychelles national team in 2005, was finally called into the squad and made his international debut against a visiting French league side on 3 June 2011, scoring twice in a 3–0 friendly victory. Betsy was called up to the Seychelles squad for the football tournament at the 2011 Indian Ocean Island Games. He started all five of the Seychelles' games in the tournament, scoring in the final against Mauritius, which finished 1–1. Betsy scored again in the resulting penalty shootout, which the Seychelles won 4–3.

Coaching career
In 2016, he was appointed head of England under-15s, having previously coached youth teams at Fulham.

Having moved on to lead the U16 and U17 squads, Betsy was appointed head coach for England U18s on 24 September 2020.

On 3 August 2021, Betsy was appointed head coach of Arsenal U23s. In his single season at Arsenal U23, Betsy took them from a 10th placed finish in 2020–21 under Steve Bould to a 3rd place finish, whilst implementing a "very fluid possession-based style of play" and using various formations, mainly variations on the 3-5-2 and 4-3-3 formations.

On 6 June 2022, Betsy was announced as the new manager of EFL League Two club Crawley Town on an initial two-year contract. However, after a disastrous start to the league season Betsy left the club on 9th October 2022 following a 3-0 defeat to Grimsby Town which left the club bottom of the league. His most notable achievement was a 2-0 win over his former team Fulham in the EFL Cup.

On 29 November 2022, Betsy was appointed as a first team coach for Championship club Wigan Athletic as part of new manager Kolo Touré's entourage, however left the club following Touré's sacking after only seven matches.

Personal life
In 2010, Betsy was studying for a BA Honours Degree in Professional Sports Writing and Broadcasting at Staffordshire University.

Career statistics

Club

International

Scores and results list Seychelles' goal tally first, score column indicates score after each Betsy goal.

Honours
Individual
PFA Team of the Year: 2005–06 Football League Two
Conference Premier Team of the Year: 2014–15

References

External links

Wycombe Wanderers profile

Nothing in life is easy, says Kevin Betsy. But I am inspired to become a great coach like my heroes seychelleslife.co.uk

1978 births
Sportspeople from Woking
Living people
People with acquired Seychellois citizenship
Seychellois footballers
Seychelles international footballers
Seychellois football managers
English footballers
English football managers
English people of Seychellois descent
Association football midfielders
Woking F.C. players
Fulham F.C. players
AFC Bournemouth players
Hull City A.F.C. players
Barnsley F.C. players
Hartlepool United F.C. players
Oldham Athletic A.F.C. players
Wycombe Wanderers F.C. players
Bristol City F.C. players
Yeovil Town F.C. players
Walsall F.C. players
Southend United F.C. players
Premier League players
English Football League players
National League (English football) players
Bognor Regis Town F.C. players
Alumni of Staffordshire University
Fulham F.C. non-playing staff
Fleet Town F.C. players
England semi-pro international footballers
Black British sportspeople
Arsenal F.C. non-playing staff
Crawley Town F.C. managers
Wigan Athletic F.C. non-playing staff
Association football coaches
English Football League managers